Kukkia is a medium-sized lake in Finland. It is a part of a chain of lakes that begins from the lakes Lummene, Vehkajärvi and Vesijako at the drainage divide between the Kokemäenjoki and Kymijoki basins and flows westwards from there through the Lake Kuohijärvi into Lake Kukkia. From Kukkia the chain of lakes drains into lake Mallasvesi through the lakes Iso-Roine, Hauhonselkä and Ilmoilanselkä. The lake is part of the Kokemäenjoki basin and is located for the biggest part in the municipality of Pälkäne in the Pirkanmaa region and for a smaller part in the area of the city of Hämeenlinna in the Tavastia Proper region.

See also
List of lakes in Finland

References

Kokemäenjoki basin
Lakes of Pälkäne
Lakes of Hämeenlinna